Bloodangel's Cry is an album by German power metal band Krypteria, released in 2007. It peaked at position 55 in the German album charts and at 44 in Switzerland.

Reception

The album received favourable reviews in Germany that marked the opulent style and lead singer Ji-In Cho's classically trained voice. The Sonic Seducer magazine called it a "highlight" after the band's EP Evolution Principle and compared the track "Sweet Revenge" to the style of Meat Loaf. Also Laut.de noted the opulent instrumentation. The Norwegian Metal Express Radio wrote "that while not really original, [it] does enough to stand out from the pack."

Track listing

Credits
Ji-In Cho - Vocals
Chris Siemons - Guitar
Frank Stumvoll - Bass
S.C. Kuschnerus - Drums

References

Krypteria albums
2007 albums